The 2023 season is the 43rd in the history of the Wollongong Wolves FC. This is the Wollongong Wolves' 18th season in the NPL NSW.

Players
As of 3 February 2023

Transfers

Transfers in

Transfers out

Contract extensions

Competitions

Overview 
{|class="wikitable" style="text-align:left"
|-
!rowspan=2 style="width:140px;"|Competition
!colspan=8|Record
|-
!style="width:30px;"|
!style="width:30px;"|
!style="width:30px;"|
!style="width:30px;"|
!style="width:30px;"|
!style="width:30px;"|
!style="width:30px;"|
!style="width:50px;"|
|-
|NPL NSW Men

|-
!Total

NPL NSW

League table

Table

Results summary

Results by round

Matches

Statistics

Appearances and goals 
Players with no appearances are not included in the list.

References

Wollongong Wolves FC seasons